Stanley Zadel (April 8, 1916 – October 21, 1982) was a professional basketball player. He played in the National Basketball League for the Sheboygan Red Skins for ten games in one season, then played for the Chicago Bruins in 18 games the following season. In 28 career games, he averaged 5.0 points per game.

References

1916 births
1982 deaths
Centers (basketball)
Chicago Bruins players
Forwards (basketball)
Sheboygan Red Skins players
American men's basketball players